As the Proto-Indo-European language (PIE)  broke up, its sound system diverged as well, as evidenced in various sound laws associated with the daughter Indo-European languages.

Especially notable is the palatalization that produced the satem languages, along with the associated ruki sound law.  Other notable changes include:

 Grimm's law and Verner's law in Proto-Germanic
 an independent change similar to Grimm's law in Armenian
 loss of prevocalic *p- in Proto-Celtic
 Brugmann's law in Proto-Indo-Iranian
 Winter's law and Hirt's law in Balto-Slavic
 merging of voiced and breathy-voiced stops, and /a/ and /o/, in various "northern" languages

Bartholomae's law in Indo-Iranian, and Sievers's law in Proto-Germanic and (to some extent) various other branches, may or may not have been common Indo-European features. A number of innovations, both phonological and morphological, represent areal features common to the Italic and Celtic languages; among them the development of labiovelars to labial consonants in some Italic and Celtic branches, producing "p-Celtic" and "q-Celtic" languages (likewise "p-Italic" and "q-Italic", although these terms are less used).  Another grouping with many shared areal innovations comprises Greek, Indo-Iranian, and Armenian; among its common phonological innovations are Grassmann's law in Greek and Indo-Iranian, and weakening of pre-vocalic /s/ to /h/ in Greek, Iranian and Armenian.

Consonants
The following table shows the Proto-Indo-European consonants  and their reflexes in selected Indo-European daughter languages. Background and further details can be found in various related articles, including Proto-Indo-European phonology, Centum and satem languages, the articles on the various sound laws referred to in the introduction, and the articles on the various IE proto-languages, language groups and language phonologies. For development of the laryngeals and syllabic consonants, see the vowels table below.

Notes for table 1:

Consonant clusters

In most cases in most languages, each consonant in a cluster develops according to the normal development given in the table above. Many consonant clusters however also show special developments in multiple languages. Some of these are given by the following table (with cases of otherwise predictable development in gray):

Notes to Table 2:

Vowels and syllabic consonants
This table shows the Proto-Indo-European vowels and syllabic consonants (as reconstructed both before and after the acceptance of laryngeal theory), and their reflexes in selected Indo-European daughter languages. Background and further details can be found in various related articles, including Proto-Indo-European phonology, the articles on the various sound laws referred to in the introduction, and the articles on the various IE proto-languages, language groups and language phonologies.

Notes:

Examples
See the list of Proto-Indo-European roots hosted at Wiktionary.

, ~ , "foot".
 Vedic Sanskrit: pā́t, pád-
 Avestan: paδa, pāδa
 Old Church Slavonic: pěšĭ, "on foot"
 Lithuanian: pėda, "foot bottom"
 Armenian: otn
 Tocharian: A pe, B pai
 Luwian: pa-da-, pa-ta-
 Ancient Greek: poús, podós
 Latin: pēs, pedis
 Celtiberian: ozas
 Gothic: fotus  (*p -> f by Grimm's Law)

, "three".
 Vedic Sanskrit: tráyas
 Avestan: θrāiiō
 Old Church Slavonic: trĭje
 Lithuanian: trỹs
 Albanian: tre
 Ancient Greek: treĩs
 Latin: trēs
 Old Irish: trí
 Welsh: tri
 Armenian: erekʿ
 Gothic: þreis  (*t -> þ by Grimm's Law)

, "hundred" (from earlier )
 Vedic Sanskrit: śatám
 Younger Avestan: satəm
 Old Church Slavonic: sŭto
 Lithuanian: šim̃tas
 Tocharian: A känt, B känte
 Ancient Greek: hekatón
 Latin: centum (pronounced kentum)
 Old Irish: cét
 Welsh: cant
 Gothic: hund (from proto-Germanic *xund-)

, "raw flesh"
 Vedic Sanskrit: kravís-, "raw meat"
 Lithuanian: kraũjas, "blood"
 Old Church Slavonic: kry, "blood"
 Ancient Greek: kréas, "meat"
 Latin: cruor, "raw blood"
 Old Irish: crú, "blood, gore"
 Old English: hrǣw, "raw"

Sound laws within PIE
A few phonological laws can be reconstructed that may have been effective prior to the final breakup of PIE by internal reconstruction.
 Sievers' law (Edgerton's law, Lindeman's option)
 Bartholomae's law
 Szemerényi's law
 Stang's law
 Siebs' law

See also
 Centum and satem languages
 Balto-Slavic languages
 Italo-Celtic
 Proto-Indo-Iranian language
 Proto-Iranian
 Proto-Greek language
 Proto-Celtic
 Proto-Germanic
 Proto-Indo-European language
 Proto-Indo-Europeans
 Kurgan hypothesis
 Indo-European languages
 List of Indo-European languages

Further reading

References

Indo-European linguistics
Sound laws